The Islamia College of Science and Commerce, Srinagar (commonly referred to as Islamia College or ICSC) is a University Grants Commission Autonomous College, and accredited as A grade by National Assessment and Accreditation Council, in the state of  Jammu and Kashmir, located on a  campus in Hawal Srinagar. 

It is affiliated to University of Kashmir. It has the distinction to be the first college in Jammu and Kashmir to take the lead in incorporating the CBCS (choice based Credit system) from the year 2015.

Establishment 

The Government of Jammu and Kashmir established this Institute in 1961 during the Prime-ministership of Late Bakshi Ghulam Mohammad as an
Autonomous Educational Institute.

Courses

Under Graduate (UG) courses 
Bachelor of Computer Application BCA
Bachelor of Business Administration (BBA)
Bachelor of Commerce (Honours) B.Com
Bachelor of Information Technology BSc IT
Bachelor of Science (Medical) BSc
Bachelor of Science (Non Medical) BSc
Bachelor of Science (Bio-Technology) BSc
Bachelor of Science (Bio-Chemistry) BSc
Bachelor of Science (Electronics) BSc
Bachelor of Arts (Economics) B. A.
Bachelor of Science (Zoology) BSc
Bachelor of Science (Nano-Science & Nano Technology) BSc
Bachelor of Science (Botany) BSc
Bachelor of Science (Chemistry) BSc

Post Graduate (PG) courses
Master of Computer Applications MCA
Master of Commerce MCom
Master of Arts (English)
Master of Business Administration  MBA
Master of Science (Botany) MSc
Master of Science (Chemistry) MSc
Master of Science (Zoology) MSc
Mathematics MSc

Integrated Post Graduate (I-PG) courses
Master of Science (Botany) MSc
Master of Science (Chemistry) MSc
Master of Science (Zoology) MSc

Awards and achievements

The National Assessment and Accreditation Council, Bangalore (NAAC) has accredited the college at A level grade in its Certificate issued on 12 September 2017; the Institutional score being 3.27 CGPA, the highest rated college in J&K. It was accredited as the College for Potential Excellence by the University Grants Commission (India) in April 2010.

Adventures Activities

The college has also Mountaineering & Trekking Club which is affiliated with The Jammu & Kashmir Mountaineering and Trekking Association. The students of the college keenly participate in the activities held by the Club. The college adventure club is headed by Dr. Altaf Ur Rehman and Aga Syed Ashtar, Jasim Ali, Syed Kumail Madni were the leads of the Islamia College Mountaineering & Trekking Club.

Notable alumni
 MC Kash - Rapper
 Ashiq Hussain Faktoo - Scholar
 Fareed Parbati - Indian Poet
 Z. G. Muhammad - Writer
 Ghulam Rasool Nazki - Poet

References

Islamia College to introduce three post-grad programmes this year. https://kashmirreader.com/2018/09/19/islamia-college-to-introduce-three-post-grad-programmes-this-year/. Kashmir Reader. (Published: September 19, 2018). Retrieved September 29, 2018

External links
http://islamiacollege.edu.in
http://www.naac.gov.in/docs/27th%20-%202nd%20cycle.pdf

Universities and colleges in Srinagar
Education in Srinagar
Degree colleges in Kashmir Division